Magnús Jónsson  was Jarl of Orkney (covering the whole of Norðreyjar Which includes not only the Orkney Islands, but the Shetland (Hjaltland) Islands c. post {Hjaltland} 1300–1321.

The Shetland were officially transferred to the Scottish from the Norwegians in 1472. Scots soon emigrated there between the 16th and 17th century.

He was a signatory to the Declaration of Arbroath, which describes him as Earl of Caithness and Orkney.

References

Footnotes

Earls of Orkney
14th-century rulers in Europe
14th-century Scottish earls
Signatories to the Declaration of Arbroath
Mormaers of Caithness
1291 births
1329 deaths